The browncheek blenny (Acanthemblemaria crockeri) is a species of chaenopsid blenny found in coral reefs in the Gulf of California, in the eastern central Pacific ocean. It can reach a maximum length of  TL. This species feeds primarily on zooplankton. The identity of the person honoured in the specific name of this specie was not specified but it is thought to be the explorer and philanthropist Charles Templeton Crocker (1884-1948).

References

External links

 

crockeri
Fish of the Gulf of California
browncheek blenny
Taxa named by William Beebe
Taxa named by John Tee-Van